The Independent Movement of Absolute Renovation ("MIRA") is a political party in Colombia, founded on March 21, 2000 by 51,095 Colombians led by lawyer and former senator Carlos Alberto Baena and Alexandra Moreno Piraquive. The party also has functions as a non-profit organization. It has representation in the Chamber of Representatives and in the Senate of the Congress of Colombia, and has also participated in the public corporations of Colombia at a regional level, being stated as the eighth-most influential political force in the country.

The party is commonly known in Colombia as "Movimiento MIRA" or just "MIRA". Members and affiliates are known as "Miraists", and their ideology is called Miraism. On a global level, MIRA has been registered with the World Intellectual Property Organization of the United Nations since September 27, 2011. Miraism has presence in many American countries: Argentina, Bolivia, Colombia, USA, Chile, Costa Rica, Ecuador, Peru, Puerto Rico and Venezuela, as well as in some European countries: the Netherlands, Norway, Sweden, Finland, Spain, Switzerland and the United Kingdom. In Asia, it is present in Japan.

At the elections of 2002 the party won as one of the many small parties parliamentary representation. The MIRA Movement took part in the legislative elections of 2006, in which it won 1 out of 165 deputies and 2 out of 100 senators. In 2018, MIRA took part in the legislative elections, in which it won 1 out of 166 deputies and 3 out of 102 senators. The current party Chairman is Manuel Antonio Virgüez.

History

Foundation

The MIRA party was created on 2 March 2000 by Carlos Alberto Baena and Alexandra Moreno Piraquive, being elected as party Chairman and Vice chairwoman, respectively. On 20 June of the same year, they requested legal recognition of the party by the National Electoral Council of Colombia, which they obtained on 26 July under the name "Independent Movement of Absolute Renovation".

First elections
The first elections in which the MIRA party participated were the regional elections of 28 October 2000. In Bogota D.C., Carlos Alberto Baena was elected councillor thanks to 20,701 votes. In the Quindío department, the economist Bernardo Valencia Cardona was elected deputy. In the Risaralda department, Martha Cecilia Alzate was elected deputy. Besides, the party obtained councillors in several municipalities and seats in several Local Administrative Units. In total, the party obtained 53 curule seats, becoming the 18th political force in the Colombian politic spectrum. Two years later, in the parliamentary elections of 2002, Alexandra Moreno Piraquive gets 81,061 votes, the highest number of votes reached by a woman running for senator in that period, and becomes senator of the Republic of Colombia.

Chairmanship of Alexandra Moreno

On 26 October 2003, the MIRA party participated in the parliamentary elections and kept Baena's position as councillor thanks to 24,277 votes and the position of Bernardo Valencia as deputy of the Assembly of Quindío thanks to 10,743 votes. The party also obtained 84 curule seats, included 10 councillor curule seats. In this period, Alexandra Moreno assumed the chairmanship of the party.

On 12 March 2006, the MIRA party obtained 237,512 votes in the parliamentary elections, which was over the 2% minimum threshold necessary to keep legal recognition in the country. As a result, Alexandra Moreno kept her seat as senator and Manuel Antonio Virgüez obtains a seat as senator. At the same time, Gloria Stella Díaz is elected as representative for Bogota thanks to 52,713 votes. After this results, the MIRA party became the ninth political force in Colombia.

In the regional elections of 2007, the MIRA party obtained for the first time a mayorship. Carlos Enrique López was elected as mayor of the Calarcá municipality in the Quindío department. Martha Liliana Agudelo, Martha Cecilia Alzate and Guillermina Bravo Montaño were elected as deputies of the Quindío, Risaralda and Valle del Cauca departments, respectively. Besides, the MIRA party obtained 35 councillors and 265 other curule seats.

Second Chairmanship of Carlos Alberto Baena
Carlos Alberto Baena is re-elected as party Chairman and Manuel Antonio Virgüez is elected as Vice chairman in 2008.

In 2009 the party participated in the popular consultation done on 27 September to select its candidates to the Congress of Colombia. In that opportunity, the party surpassed the expected votation of 80,000 votes and obtained over 205,000, 19,397 of which were given by youngsters between 14 and 18 years old. This popular consultation was the first which allowed the participation of under-age people.

In the 2010 parliamentary elections, the MIRA party obtained 324,109 votes. As a result, the party got four curule seats in the Congress of Colombia and Carlos Alberto Baena was elected to be senator. In the presidential elections of the same year, the MIRA party did not present a candidate to run for the presidency of Colombia nor supported any of the other parties´candidates. In the 2010 parliamentary elections, the MIRA party applied the zip system to their lists of candidates for the first time, which allowed it to have the same percentage of female and male candidates.

In March 2011, Marisol Moreno was elected as Vice chairwoman and Ana Belsú Rodríguez was elected as secretary general.

In the regional elections of October 2011, the MIRA party obtained the governorate of the Caquetá department, the mayorship of the El Paujil municipality, seven deputies, 47 councillors and over 300 other curule seats. Later on, in an atypical election done on 29 January 2012. the party obtained 10 additional curule seats.

In the 2012 popular consultation, the MIRA party obtained the highest votation among the participating political parties and groups thanks to 284,869 votes.

For the 2014 parliamentary elections, the party has defined a closed list of candidates to the Senate and has decided not to run for the Andean Parliament elections neither to participate in the popular consultation. The party also decided not to present a candidate for the 2014 presidential elections nor to support any other presidential candidate.

Organizational structure
The administrative and directive bodies of the MIRA party are:

The members of the National Direction are: 
The Chairman
The Vice chairman
The secretary-general 
The congressmen of the party

Political positions

Miraism
Since its foundation, the MIRA party has declared that its only political position is the Miraism, which is defined as:
A change in the attitude of the individual towards looking for the general welfare of people.
A way of doing politics without using any violent means.
An ideology that transcends the classical distinction between left-wing and right-wing.

Political convictions
The MIRA party has been characterized by never having forged political alliances or coalitions with any political party, and by trying to have lists of candidates with the same proportion of female and male candidates. As a result, it was the only political party who presented the same number of female candidates as that of male candidates in the 2010 elections. Moreover, the MIRA party has never been accused of having any relation with the paramilitary groups or the guerrilla movements.

Social issues
The MIRA party has been opposed to the approval of the euthanasia, abortion and same-sex marriage.

Characteristics of the party

Social aid

The MIRA party has been known in the United States mainly for offering help to poor people. The party candidate to the Chamber of Representatives for the 2014 parliamentary elections Jorge Muñoz received the Presidential Citizens Medal for his social work in New York City.

Legislative activity
The MIRA party is known for its assiduous work at the Congress of Colombia. As a result, the party proposes about half of the total number of bills although it has few curule seats.

Media
The party has a biweekly generalist newspaper called MIRA The Newspaper of the people (Spanish: MIRA El periódico de la gente), and an Internet radio station called "MiraMás Online". The party's website is considered the best among all the political parties´ websites of Colombia, which made it receive the Colombia Online Prize in the category "Best political website" in 2010.

Members in active public service
The MIRA party has the following members holding curule seats in Colombia:

Senate 

Ana Paola Agudelo García 
Carlos Eduardo Guevara Villabón 
Aydeé Lizarazo Cubillos

Chamber of Representatives
Irma Luz Herrera (Bogotá)

Departmental Assemblies

City Councils
47 councillors.

Local Administrative Units
131 aediles.

See also
2002 Colombian legislative election
2006 Colombian legislative election
Politics of Colombia
List of political parties in Colombia
Senate of Colombia
Chamber of Representatives of Colombia
Elections in Colombia
Evangelical political parties in Latin America

References

External links
 Official web site Spanish
 MIRA Chile Spanish
 MIRA Ecuador Spanish
 MIRA Japan Spanish
 MIRA Puerto Rico Spanish
 MIRA Scandinavia Spanish / Swedish
 MIRA Spain Spanish
 MIRA UK English
 MIRA USA English 
 MIRA Switzerland English 
 MIRAISM® English
 MIRA USA YouTube
 MIRA USA Facebook
 MIRA uk YouTube
 MIRA uk Facebook
 Miraísmo Internacional en YouTube

Christian democratic parties in Colombia
Political parties established in 2000
2000 establishments in Colombia
Protestant political parties
Protestantism in Colombia